The Our Lady of the Assumption Cathedral  also called Granada Cathedral is a neoclassical Catholic cathedral located in Granada, Nicaragua,  southeast of Managua. The church is the main temple of the Diocese of Granada, and its bishop is Jorge Solórzano Pérez.

The first cathedral temple was built around 1525 with tapicel and rafaz stone, brick, lime and straw roof. By 1578, the church had already been burned twice. Seven years later, in 1585, it started to become known colloquially as "La Iglesia Bonita," or "The Beautiful Church." The second temple was completed in about 1751 with lime, stone, and brick.

In 1916, the iron frame intended for the central dome was brought from the United States, only three years after the Diocese of Granada was created by the Roman Catholic Church.

See also
Roman Catholicism in Nicaragua
Our Lady of the Assumption Church (disambiguation)

References

Roman Catholic cathedrals in Nicaragua
Granada, Nicaragua
Roman Catholic churches completed in 1972
20th-century Roman Catholic church buildings in Nicaragua
Neoclassical architecture in Nicaragua